Reggie Gavin (born January 14, 1995), known by the stage name Symone, is an American drag queen and model. She is best known as the winner of season 13 of RuPaul's Drag Race (2021). She is a member of the queer art collective House of Avalon.

Early life 
Born Reggie Gavin, Symone was raised in Conway, Arkansas, as the youngest of three children, with two siblings who are significantly older.  A shy child due to anxiety about being gay, Symone discovered drag as a teenager in 2009 after RuPaul's Drag Race debuted, and began to experiment with makeup and drag, attending senior prom in a dress.

Career

2013–2020: Drag beginnings 
Shortly after high school graduation in 2013, she performed drag for the first time at Triniti Nightclub under the name Delilah Alamaine. While a student at University of Arkansas at Little Rock, she began to build a following as a performer at Discovery and The Factory, and later changed her stage name to Symone, after a character in a play she wrote in high school. She hosted a series called Symone Says. Of her drag identity, she said Symone represents "the person that I really am. I would say Reggie is a mask I put on every day."

Symone is a member of the queer fashion and pop culture collective House of Avalon along with season 12 Drag Race finalist Gigi Goode. The collective was started in 2016 in Little Rock by designer Marko Monroe, Hunter Crenshaw, and Grant Vanderbilt. Vanderbilt is Symone's drag mother.

Symone moved to Los Angeles in 2019 and joined other relocated members of House of Avalon.

2021–present: RuPaul's Drag Race success 
In 2021, Symone gained wider prominence as a contestant on season 13 of RuPaul's Drag Race, where she became the show's first Arkansas contestant. She has received positive reception from critics for her drag fashion and persona, which frequently nod to Black cultural icons like Lil' Kim and Grace Jones. After the first two episodes aired, pop culture websites Vulture and Jezebel stated that Symone was a frontrunner to win season 13. Rihanna sent Symone an Instagram DM after seeing her on the show: "You soooo EVERYTHING! Nasty Lil bitch! I live for every second of it! You're a true joy to watch!"

Symone received media attention for her runway dress worn on episode 9: a white faux leather dress with exaggerated hips, red crystal bullet holes on the back, and a white headpiece emblazoned with Say Their Names. As she walked the runway she recited the names of several murdered Black Americans: Breonna Taylor, George Floyd, Brayla Stone, Trayvon Martin, Tony McDade, Nina Pop, and Monika Diamond. The dress was designed by Marko Monroe and created by Howie B. Symone said her intention with the dress was to state: "No matter how pretty or beautiful or non-threatening I—and Black people—seem, we're still seen as a threat." Symone ultimately won the season in the grand finale that aired on April 23, 2021.

In August 2021, Symone was a featured performer in Drag Fest, a live music festival. Symone was featured on the cover of the September 2021 issue of Interview. That same month, Symone attended the 2021 MTV Video Music Awards, the 2021 Met Gala, and walked the red carpet at the 73rd Primetime Emmy Awards.

Awards and nominations

|-
! scope="row" | 2021
| RuPaul's Drag Race
| People's Choice Award for The Competition Contestant of 2021
| 
|-
! scope="row" | 2022
| Herself
| Queerty Award for Drag Royalty
| 
|-
! scope="row" rowspan="3"|2022
| 2021 Met Gala
| The WOWIE Award for Best Red Carpet Look
| 
|-
|Jimmy Kimmel Live!
|The WOWIE Award for Best TV Moment<small>(Shared with Rupaul)
|
|-
|House of Avalon
|The WOWIE Award for Fiercest Party People
|

Filmography

Film

Television

Music videos

Featured and cameo roles

Web series 
{| class="wikitable plainrowheaders sortable"
! scope="col" |Year
! scope="col" |Title
! scope="col" |Role
! scope="col" |Notes
! class="unsortable" style="text-align: center;" |
|-
|-
|2021
|The X Change Rate
|Herself
|Guest
|style="text-align: center;" |
|-
|2021
|Ruvealing the Look
|Herself
|Guest
| style="text-align: center;" |
|-
|2021
|Whatcha Packin'''
|Herself
|Guest
| style="text-align: center;" |
|-
| 2021
| Beauty Secrets| Herself
| Guest
|style="text-align: center;" |
|-
|2021
|Binge|Herself
|Guest
|style="text-align: center;" |
|-
|2021
|The Awardist|Herself
|Guest
| style="text-align: center;" |
|-
|2021
|The Pit Stop|Herself
|Guest
| style="text-align: center;" |
|}

Discography
As part of the Cast of RuPaul's Drag Race, Season 13
As lead artist

As featured artist

 References 

 External links 

 Official Instagram

The Pride Series – Interview with British Vogue'' on YouTube

1995 births
Living people
African-American drag queens
African-American models
American drag queens
LGBT African Americans
LGBT people from Arkansas
People from Conway, Arkansas
RuPaul's Drag Race winners
University of Arkansas at Little Rock alumni